A keynote in literature, music or public speaking is the principal underlying theme of a larger idea.

Keynote may also refer to:
 Tonic (music), the first note of a major or minor scale, from which the 'key' takes its name
 Keynote (presentation software), presentation creation software designed by Apple, Inc.
 Keynote (notetaking software), Windows note-taking software designed by Tranglos Software
 Keynote Records, a record label
 Keynote Flour, a former brand of flour sold in Canada
 Keynote DeviceAnywhere, a subsidiary of Keynote Systems, Inc.
 Keynote Systems, a US-based Internet company
The Keynotes, 1940s UK vocal quartet before The Johnston Brothers, contracted to Decca
Bill Maynard and The Keynotes, United Kingdom in the Eurovision Song Contest 1957
Primo Scala and The Keynotes, Cruising Down the River

See also
 Keynotes (disambiguation)